Meant to Be  is a 2017 Philippine television drama romantic comedy series broadcast by GMA Network. It aired from January 9, 2017 to June 23, 2017 on the network's Telebabad line-up replacing Someone to Watch Over Me.

NUTAM (Nationwide Urban Television Audience Measurement) People in Television Homes ratings are provided by AGB Nielsen Philippines.

Series overview

Episodes

January 2017

February 2017

March 2017

April 2017

May 2017

June 2017

References

Lists of Philippine drama television series episodes